Woman's Own is a British lifestyle magazine aimed at women.

Publication
Woman's Own was first published in 1932 by Newnes. In its early years it placed women's rights and social problems firmly in the foreground. Its first "agony aunt" was Leonora Eyles.

It remains one of the UK's most famous women's magazines and is published by Future plc. The magazine includes articles on celebrity gossip, real-life stories, fashion, beauty, shopping deals, wellbeing, food, and travel. The editor is Kira Agass.

Margaret Thatcher

In 1987, Margaret Thatcher gave an interview to journalist Douglas Keay in which she gave her opinion of individual and governmental responsibility, usually reduced to the comment: “There is no such thing as society”. The magazine sponsors an annual Children of Courage Award, first launched in 1973, which recognises children who have shown heroism, endured pain, disability, or devoted their lives to caring for a family in need.

Recent history
The magazine’s recent history has been troubled with a succession of editorial makeovers, relaunches and sudden departures. The magazine was left without an editor for five months from September 2006, following the abrupt resignation of Elsa McAlonan, just a few months after her second revamp of the title during her four years in charge. In 2007, Karen Livermore was brought in from Family Circle, another magazine within the IPC stable. Her £2 million facelift failed to stem a long-term slide in circulation that saw weekly sales slipping towards 340,000 by the end of 2007, down from 450,000 in 2005 and well behind the market leader, Take a Break, circulation over 1 million.

In 2008, the accuracy of the magazine’s health and medical reporting was the subject of a Press Complaints Commission enquiry with its journalistic ethics and its treatment of case studies questioned in the mainstream press. ("Jackie’s tale sets alarm bells ringing: how Woman’s Own sexed up Addison’s disease for its own ends.").

References

External links
Official website

1932 establishments in the United Kingdom
Women's magazines published in the United Kingdom
Weekly magazines published in the United Kingdom
Magazines established in 1932
George Newnes Ltd magazines